6 is the sixth studio album by the industrial rock band Pigface. It was released in 2009 on Full Effect Records. The song "KMFPF", an acronym for "Kill Mother-Fucking Pigface", is a warped allusion to the band KMFDM.

Track listing

Personnel
 Martin Atkins - drums, programming, engineering, mixing, production
 Chris Connelly - vocals (1)
 Curse Mackey - vocals (1, 2), guitar
 Krztoff - vocals (2), guitar
 Hanin Elias - vocals (3, 4, 9)
 En Esch - vocals (2, 4)
 Charles Levi - bass
 Alex Møklebust - vocals (5)
 Kim Ljung, bass, vocals (5)
 Dan Heide – guitar (5)
 Patrick Ryan - loops (5)
 Tristan Rudat - guitar (5)
 Mary Byker - vocals (6)
 Noko - guitar (6), bass (6), composition (6)
 Jim Marcus - vocals (7)
 Martin Bowes - vocals (10), synthesizers (10)
 Laurie Reade - vocals (10)
 Bradley Bills - yang-qin (10)
 The Enigma - vocals (11)
 Empty Gesture - Artwork
 Engineer - Martin Atkins, Miguel Torres, Tom VX and Van Christie
 Performers - Anders Odden, Bradley Bills, Charles Levi, Curse Mackey, Dan Heide, En Esch, Hanin Elias, Harrison Atkins, Ian Atkins, Jim Marcus, Lee Fraser, Louis Svitek, Martin Atkins, Mary Byker, Noko, Patrick Ryan, Raziel Panic, Steve Denakas, Tamar Berk, Tristan Rudat, Van Christie
 Producer - Martin Atkins

External links
Pigface Album at Discogs

References

2009 albums
Pigface albums